Bature Yaro Kawu  (born on 15 December 1995) is a Nigerian professional footballer who plays as a central midfielder for Asaria FC (Libya). He also plays for the Nigeria national football team.

Honors
2016-2017 Premier League Champions with Plateau United FC
2013 Winner of the FA Cup Lagos State with C.O.D United
2009Winner of the FA Cup Abuja with AMAC FC

* Senior club appearances and goals counted for the domestic league only and correct as of 20 September 2021

External links 
 

1995 births
Living people
Nigerian footballers
Nigeria international footballers
Association football forwards
Sportspeople from Jos
Nigeria A' international footballers
2016 African Nations Championship players
Nigerian expatriate footballers
Nigerian expatriate sportspeople in Libya
Expatriate footballers in Libya